René ("Spillo") Gusperti (born 18 March 1971) is an Italian former swimmer. He was a world class freestyle sprinter during the 1990s and unchallenged Italian Champion in the same years.

Biography
Gusperti was born in Schlanders/Silandro. He began swimming in Rari Nantes Trento, there he  met his long-lasting coach Walter Bolognani, current head-coach of the Italian Junior National Team. He later joined Fiamme Gialle (the Athletic Team of Guardia di Finanza) and won his first Italian Championship in 1991, from then on ten years of nearly uninterrupted victories follows. During the nineties Gusperti competed in all the major international events, including 1992 and 1996 Summer Olympics. In 2005 he joined CSI Trento Nuoto where he still swim -as of 2007- and coaches. He is the brother of André Gusperti, another renowned former Italian swimmer.

Major achievements

Personal Bests

International

Italian Championships

Other international participations
 Summer Olympic Games: Barcelona 1992, Atlanta 1996.
 World Long Course Championships: Rome 1994.
 World Short Course Championships: Rio de Janeiro 1995, Gothenburg 1997.
 European Long Course Championships: Athens 1991, Sheffield 1993, Vienna 1995,  Seville 1997, Istanbul 1999.
 European Short Course Championships: Gelsenkirchen 1991, Espoo 1992, Gateshead 1993, Riesa 1996.
 Mediterranean Games: Athens 1991, Languedoc-Roussillon 1993, Bari 1997.

External links
Agenda Diana, René Gusperti page
RAI Profile

1971 births
Living people
People from Schlanders
Italian male freestyle swimmers
Olympic swimmers of Italy
Swimmers at the 1992 Summer Olympics
Swimmers at the 1996 Summer Olympics
Sportspeople from Sterzing
Mediterranean Games gold medalists for Italy
Swimmers at the 1991 Mediterranean Games
Mediterranean Games medalists in swimming
20th-century Italian people